Norman Connors (born March 1, 1947) is an American jazz drummer, composer, arranger, and producer who has led a number of influential jazz and R&B groups. He also achieved several big R&B hits of the day, especially with love ballads. He is possibly best known for the 1976 hit, "You Are My Starship" on which lead vocals were sung by Michael Henderson.

Biography
Connors lived in the same Philadelphia neighbourhood as comedian/actor Bill Cosby and had an interest in jazz from a very early age when he began to play drums. Whilst at elementary school, Connors was exposed to jazz extensively and became heavily influenced by the drummer Lex Humphries and the younger brother of bassist and Jazz-Messenger player, Spanky DeBrest. He first met his idol, Miles Davis, aged just 13 in 1960.

He once sat in for Elvin Jones at a John Coltrane performance he attended while in middle school. Connors studied music at Temple University and Juilliard. His first recording was on Archie Shepp's 1967 release, Magic of JuJu. He played with Pharoah Sanders for the next few years until signing in 1972 with jazz label, Cobblestone Records, a division of Buddah Records, and releasing his first record as a bandleader.

Connors began to focus more on R&B material in the mid-1970s after signing with Buddah Records and then becoming the label's A&R manager. He scored several US hits with songs featuring guest vocalists such as Michael Henderson, Jean Carn, and Phyllis Hyman. The most successful of these was "You Are My Starship" (#4 R&B, #27 Pop), featuring Henderson in 1976, while "Valentine Love", his first chart success, made #10 R&B in 1975, with vocals from Henderson and Jean Carne. Dee Dee Bridgewater also performed with him on the jazz album "Love from the Sun". He has also produced recordings for various artists, including collaborators like Jean Carn, Phyllis Hyman, Al Johnson, Norman Brown, and saxophonist Marion Meadows.

Connors switched to the Arista label when Buddah was bought out in 1978 and achieved a crossover to the disco scene in 1980 when he had the hit 'Take it to the Limit', which was released on 12" single. The B side, "Black Cow" (an instrumental) was written by Steely Dan's Walter Becker and Donald Fagen.

In 1988 he had a hit on Capitol Records with "I Am Your Melody" (with B-side "Samba for Maria") from his LP Passion which he produced featuring singer Spencer Harrison (1962–1994). Connors also introduced another up and coming singer on the Passion LP by the name of Gabrielle Goodman who sang Minnie Riperton's "Loving You", "My One And Only Love", "Private Stock" and duets with Harrison on the LP.

His later work, Star Power, features smooth jazz and urban crossover music.

On October 30, 2022, Connors life was featured on a TV One Episode of Unsung.

Discography

Studio albums

Compilation albums

Singles

As sideman
With Carlos Garnett
Black Love (Muse, 1974)
With Sam Rivers
 Streams (Impulse!, 1973)
 Hues (Impulse!, 1973)

With Pharoah Sanders
 Live at the East (Impulse!, 1972)
 Village of the Pharoahs (Impulse!, 1973)
 Love in Us All (Impulse!, 1972–73)
 Wisdom Through Music (Impulse!, 1973)
 Love Will Find a Way (Arista, 1978)
 Beyond a Dream (Arista Novus, 1981)

References

External links
 

1947 births
Living people
American jazz drummers
Musicians from Philadelphia
Cobblestone Records artists
Buddah Records artists
Arista Records artists
Capitol Records artists
Motown artists
20th-century American drummers
American male drummers
Jazz musicians from Pennsylvania
20th-century American male musicians
American male jazz musicians